The 3 Skypephone (also known as the 3 Skypephone S1) is a UMTS, GSM and VoIP mobile phone. The phone is a joint product by Hutchison 3G and Skype.
The 3 Skypephone S1 was the first in the 3 Skypephone Series to launch . It was widely acknowledged for its difference from other mobile phones for introducing Skype as a native application and introducing Brew OS to a European audience.

My3's website previously identified the phone model as the "Amoi 8512", while the packaging the phone comes in, calls it the "WP-S1". However, the phone is currently being marketed under the name 3 Skypephone S1 and is currently (as of November 2008) available in 3's own stores (including 3Stores within Superdrug premises) and in retail, depending on country.

Windows Live Messenger was initially supported on the phone in selected countries only. However, in late November 2007 it was released as a Java application in the UK, and is available via the Launcher softkey on the phone. Usage of Messenger is free on 3's UK and Ireland networks.

The physical dimensions of the phone include a weight of 86 g and size of 100×44×13.6 mm.

The battery life is as follows:

 Standby: 320 hours
 Talk Time: 270 minutes
 Video Talk Time: 170 minutes

In the box 
 Handset
 Lithium-ion battery 3.7V, 1150 mAh.
 Battery cover (magnetic).
 Personal stereo hands free kit (via mini-USB connector).
 USB cable.
 Mains charger (USB connector).
 CD–ROM for PC connection.
 256MB or 512MB microSD memory card (no adapter) (UK, Ireland and Austria).
 512MB Kingston microSD memory card with adapter (Australia)
 3 user guide.
 Quick start guide for Skype.

Supported functionality
 Bluetooth stack with OBEX file transfer and A2DP support
 Streaming video (can receive TV channels and watch movies over the 3G network)
 Streaming audio
 Free Skype-to-skype calls
 E-mail
 T9 dictionary
 Camera
 Video recording
 Audio recording
 Media player that plays AAC, AMR, M4A, MP3, WAV, 3GP, MP4, WMV and WMA files 
 PC Suite synchronization
 116.5 kbit/s cell modem via Bluetooth or USB
 Podcasting with Mobilcast (unofficially supported)
 Supports Java ME applications such as Opera Mini and many Java ME games.
 Charging via standard mini USB cable.  (Through  its own charging unit (wall plug) and USB to mini USB cable are included, any standards mini USB cable can be used to charge the skypephone in various locations or when traveling.) However, see issues below.
 Brew games
 3 launcher menu
 Pre-loaded Skype client Powered by Brew

Issues 

 Poor battery life when streaming video (e.g. Mobile YouTube or Mobile TV).
 The Skypephone does not support Skype Video Call.
 The Skypephone does not support SkypeIn yet (except Hong Kong).
 However, some people are working around this by purchasing Skype Pro and forwarding incoming calls when busy to the actual mobile phone number.
 SkypeIn is available Feb 2008 in Hong Kong only.
 SkypeIn not officially available other than Hong Kong, but workaround software is available to use on your PC to connect SkypeIn calls to your 3Skypephone.
 There was formerly no SkypeOut functionality, however this has been addressed in the UK with a software update available on the application shop and under a folder called "Skype". Only calls to phones abroad are allowed, but a workaround to allow Skypeout calls to phones in the UK is possible.
 Skype conferencing is supported, however the handset cannot host conference calls, only join existing ones.
 No front-facing camera for video calls
 The rubber coating on the battery cover of the Black model is known to blister and peel when warm.
 The Skypephone only takes 20 Calendar entries.e.
 However you can get around this by connecting the handsfree headset.
 Screen is made of plastic
 Back cover on white model gets stained easily.
 Japanese text is not supported; chat messages containing this appear blank.
 Many applications are not tested for the 3 Skypephone S1 (However, as a general rule it is compatible with the same Java games and applications as the Sony Ericsson W810I).
 Mini USB connector is slightly non standard as the plastic lip that holds the electrical connectors on the cable needs to be slightly thicker to allow contact with the connectors on the phone. You may need to try a couple of different cables to find one that connects properly, or even slightly dent the cable connector metal housing to force the pins to be raised slightly.

See also
 3 Skypephone Series
 3 Skypephone S2
 Skype
 Hutchison 3G (3)
 BREW

References

External links
3 UK page on the 3 Skypephone series
Simple Skypeout National Calls Workaround at TickTocktech

3 (company)
Skype